Kuutõbine is the eighth album by Estonian rock band Terminaator, released in 2003.

Track listing 

 Ford (Kreem/Kreem, Liitmaa) - 3:47
 Carmen (Kreem/Kreem, Liitmaa) - 3:20
 15 November (Kreem/Kreem, Liitmaa) - 3:39
 Inetu (Ugly) (Kreem/Kreem, Liitmaa) - 4:14
 Romula (Wrecking yard) (Kreem/Liitmaa) - 3:04
 Sa tead (You know) (Kreem/Kreem, Liitmaa) - 5:05
 Millest on tehtud väikesed tüdrukud (What little girls are made of) (Kreem/Kreem, Liitmaa) - 4:07
 Kuutõbine (Sleepwalker) (Kreem/Kreem, Liitmaa) - 3:49
 Kõik mis ei tapa (Everything that doesn't kill) (Kreem/Kreem, Terminaator) - 3:38
 Vastasmaja aknad (The windows next door) (Kreem/Kreem, Terminaator) - 4:28
 Kaktusviin (Cactus spirit) (Kreem/Liitmaa) - 4:57

Song information 
 "Ford" is about Jaagup's first car Ford Escort.
 "Carmen" is about a party girl. It also features background vocals from Janne Saar and Lea Liitmaa.
 "15 november" is about missing a romantic occasion.
 "Inetu" is about a girl from a slum, who has had a really sad life, with no friends, his father beat her and her mother didn't care. The girl runs away from home, intending never to come back to that slum. The chorus references "The Ugly Duckling" in a consoling way. The drums on this track were performed by Kristo Rajasaare.
 "Romula" compares heartbreak to a car being wrecked.
 "Sa tead" is about confusion, when loved ones aren't sincere and outspoken. The female voice is from Kadi Toom.
 "Millest on tehtud väikesed tüdrukud" is an ode to spring and women. The title comes from an Estonian children's song.
 "Kuutõbine" is about the effect of sleepwalking to the sleepwalker's friends.
 "Kõik mis ei tapa" is about a man finding himself. The title comes from the proverb "kõik mis ei tapa, teeb tugevaks" ("everything that doesn't kill you, makes you stronger").
 "Vastasmaja aknad" is about a peeping tom.
 "Kaktusviin" is about healing wounds (also in an indirect meaning) after a war. The name is a reference to tequila.

Singles 
 2002: Romula
 2003: Carmen
 2004: Vastasmaja aknad

External links 
 Estmusic.com Listen to the songs.

2003 albums
Terminaator albums
Estonian-language albums